Kelvin Sydney Lippiatt (6 January 1920 – 2 May 2013) was an Australian rules footballer who played with Hawthorn in the Victorian Football League (VFL).

His brother Harry Lippiatt played with Essendon in the VFL.

Prior to his VFL career, Lippiatt served as a private in the Volunteer Defence Corps during World War II.

Notes

External links 

1920 births
2013 deaths
Australian rules footballers from Victoria (Australia)
Hawthorn Football Club players
Coburg Football Club players
Volunteer Defence Corps soldiers
People from Coburg, Victoria
Australian military personnel of World War II
Military personnel from Melbourne